The Allan Green Conservatory was a pyramid shaped botanical display facility on the Esplanade Reserve in Perth, Western Australia.

It was built in 1979 as part of the state's 150th anniversary celebrations and was designed to provide a public display of exotic tropical plants and rare palms not normally seen in Perth.  It included internal elevated pathways.

It was named after William Allan McInnes Green, town clerk and chief executive officer of the City of Perth for many years.

Patronage to the conservatory declined from about 1996, and in 2006 the City of Perth closed the facility while considering redeveloping the facility for café/restaurant use.  After investigating its commercial options, the City decided to close the facility indefinitely in light of the State Government's planned developments on the Esplanade Reserve. The conservatory was demolished in June 2012 as part of the Elizabeth Quay project, in which it and other heritage elements are proposed to be memorialised by signage.

References

Buildings and structures in Perth, Western Australia
WAY 79
Perth waterfront
1979 establishments in Australia
2012 disestablishments in Australia
Demolished buildings and structures in Western Australia
Buildings and structures demolished in 2012
State Register of Heritage Places in the City of Perth